Saint Domnina and her daughters Berenice (Bernice, Veronica, Verine, Vernike) and Prosdoce are venerated as Christian martyrs by the Roman Catholic and Eastern Orthodox Churches.

The Diocletianic or Great Persecution was the last and most severe persecution of Christians in the Roman Empire. In 303, the emperors Diocletian, Maximian, Galerius, and Constantius issued a series of edicts rescinding Christians' legal rights and demanding that they comply with traditional religious practices.

In the winter of 302, Galerius urged Diocletian to begin a general persecution of the Christians. Diocletian was wary, and asked the oracle of Apollo at Didyma for guidance. The oracle's reply was read as an endorsement of Galerius's position, and a general persecution was called on February 23, 303.

The persecution failed to check the rise of the Church. By 324, Constantine was sole ruler of the empire, and Christianity had become his favored religion. Although the persecution resulted in death, torture, imprisonment, or dislocation for many Christians, the majority of the empire's Christians avoided punishment. The persecution did, however, cause many churches to split between those who had complied with imperial authority (the traditores), and those who had remained "pure".

According to Eusebius, Domnina was a Christian noblewoman from Antioch who had two young daughters.  According to one account, Domnina and her daughters settled at Edessa, Mesopotamia.  Her husband was a pagan.

Domnina was arrested by soldiers for her adherence to the Christian religion.  Fearing that the soldiers would rape her and her daughters, they threw themselves into a river after they asked their guards for a chance to rest for a while or after the soldiers had become drunk with wine.  All three women drowned.

The account of St. John Chrysostom tells a slightly different story: according to Chrysostom, Domnina, after jumping into the river, pulled her daughters in with her to prevent them from being raped.  Chrysostom praised Domnina for her courage and Domnina's daughters for their obedience.

References 

Syrian Christian saints
4th-century Christian martyrs
310 deaths
Groups of Christian martyrs of the Roman era
Year of birth unknown
Ante-Nicene Christian female saints
4th-century Roman women